Steven J. Davis is an American economist. He is currently the William H. Abbott Distinguished Service Professor Of International Business and Economics at the University of Chicago Booth School of Business and a Senior Fellow at the Hoover Institution. Davis is known for developing and studying longitudinal firm-level microdata and economic uncertainty. As of April 2020, Davis is ranked 33rd by the Research Papers in Economics in terms of the number of citations in the last 10 years discounted by citation age.

Education 
Davis graduated from Central Catholic High School in Portland Oregon. He received a Bachelor of Arts in economics from Portland State University in 1980. Davis completed his gradate and doctoral work at Brown University earning an A.M. in 1981 and a Ph.D. in 1986. After receiving his doctorate, Davis began teaching at the University of Chicago Booth School of Business.

Work

Job creation and destruction 
Davis is known for his work using firm-level longitudinal data to explore the dynamics of job creation, job destruction, and economic performance. In his 1996 book Job Creation and Destruction (co-authored with John Haltiwanger and Scott Schuh), he uses plant-level data from the manufacturing industry to examine how businesses and workers respond to changes in their economic environments. Among the most striking findings in the book are the large and persistent gross job flows, which dwarf the net job flows that are commonly observed in employment data. Job Creation and Destruction laid the groundwork for subsequent research that not only confirmed the existence of such large gross job flows in other time periods, sectors, and countries, but also delved into the mechanisms and theories that would explain these flows.

In a review published in the Journal of Economic Literature in 1997, David Blanchflower concluded that Job Creation and Destruction "is an important piece of work. Not many books start literatures. This one is likely to. Buy it." (page 1400). In a review published in Economica in 1998, Jonathan Haskel noted that Job Creation and Destruction "is a definitive documentation of job creation and destruction in the United States and has already proved to be the starting point for a rich body of work. How many other books can claim to be so influential in their field?" (page 156). Job Creation and Destruction was a Choice Outstanding Academic Title in 1996.

Job growth 
Davis has empirically studied the basis for the conventional view that small firms are responsible for the majority of job growth in the U.S. economy. His research suggests that it is young firms, not small firms per se, that create the disproportionate number of jobs.

Other academic work 
Davis has also published widely cited articles in the Quarterly Journal of Economics, the American Economic Review, the Review of Economic Studies, the Review of Economics and Statistics, among others.

Books 
 Davis, S., J. Haltiwanger, and S. Schuh. 1996. Job Creation and Destruction. Cambridge: MIT Press.

References

External links 

 

Living people
Year of birth missing (living people)
American economists
Portland State University alumni
Brown University alumni
University of Chicago Booth School of Business faculty